Igho Otegheri (born November 20, 1983 in Nigeria) is a Nigerian football striker. He played for Heartland F.C.

Career
Otegheri began his career with Wikki Tourists in 2004 before transferring to Enugu Rangers for two years. He then signed with Dolphins F.C. in 2007.

Otegheri later joined Heartland F.C., where he played until 22 January 2009 when he moved to Beitar Jerusalem F.C. with compatriot Anderson West. He was released from his contract at 1 February 2009 and turned back to Heartland F.C.

International 
Otegheri was a member of the Super Eagles, his debut coming on 2 February 2003 in a match against Costa Rica

Personal life
He married Nigerian track and field athlete Blessing Okagbare in September 2014.

References

External links
Pictures At FC Beitar Jerusalem

1983 births
Living people
Nigerian footballers
Enyimba F.C. players
Expatriate footballers in Israel
Association football forwards
Nigerian expatriate footballers
Heartland F.C. players
Dolphin F.C. (Nigeria) players
Rangers International F.C. players
Wikki Tourists F.C. players
Nigeria international footballers